Van Gogh is a 1948 short French documentary film directed by Alain Resnais. It won an Oscar in 1950 for Best Short Subject (Two-Reel). It is a remake of a film made the previous year.

Cast
 Claude Dauphin as Récitant / Narrator (voice)

References

External links

1948 films
1948 documentary films
1948 short films
1940s French-language films
1940s short documentary films
Black-and-white documentary films
Documentary films about painters
French short documentary films
French black-and-white films
Live Action Short Film Academy Award winners
Films directed by Alain Resnais
Short film remakes
Films about Vincent van Gogh
1940s French films